Annihilator is the thirteenth album by Canadian heavy metal band Annihilator, released on May 17, 2010 by Earache Records in Europe, Marquee Records in Japan, Riot Entertainment in Australia and by iTunes in the US and Canada.

Track listing

Personnel
Jeff Waters - lead & rhythm guitar, bass, backing vocals
Dave Padden - lead vocals, rhythm guitar
Ryan Ahoff - drums

Chart performance

References

External links
'Annihilator' - Uber Rock Album Review
Blabbermouth.net

Annihilator (band) albums
2010 albums
Earache Records albums